The 1972 United States presidential election in South Carolina took place on November 7, 1972. All 50 states and the District of Columbia were part of the 1972 United States presidential election. South Carolina voters chose 8 electors to the Electoral College, who voted for president and vice president.

South Carolina overwhelmingly voted for the Republican nominees, incumbent President Richard Nixon of California and his running mate Vice President Spiro Agnew of Maryland. Nixon and Agnew defeated the Democratic nominees, Senator George McGovern of South Dakota and his running mate U.S. Ambassador Sargent Shriver of Maryland.

Nixon carried South Carolina with 70.58% of the vote to McGovern's 27.92%, a victory margin of 42.66%. This election provided the Republican Party with its best presidential result in South Carolina since Reconstruction and constitutes the only presidential election where the Republican candidate carried every county in the state. This election marks the last time South Carolina voted to the left of neighboring Georgia.

This is the only time,  that Marlboro County has voted for a Republican presidential candidate since that county was founded in 1896, and the first time the Wallace counties of Union and Cherokee had ever voted Republican. It is the last time,  when Orangeburg County, Williamsburg County, Marion County, Jasper County, Fairfield County, Hampton County, Lee County, and Allendale County have voted for a Republican presidential candidate. McCormick County would not vote Republican again until Donald Trump in 2016.

Results

Results by county

Notes

References

South Carolina
1972
1972 South Carolina elections